Nick Bruckner (born May 19, 1961) is a former American football wide receiver. He played for the New York Jets from 1983 to 1985.

References

1961 births
Living people
American football wide receivers
Syracuse Orange football players
New York Jets players